The Sápmi women's football team is a football team representing the Sámi people, who inhabit northern parts of Norway, Sweden, Finland and Russia. The team is a member of the Confederation of Independent Football Associations. It is organized by FA Sápmi.

The women's selection becomes champion of the Viva Women's World Cup 2008, winning the first leg and second leg of the final 4-0 and 11-1 (15-1) against the Kurdistan women's football team.

The women's selection becomes champion of the ConIFA Women's Football World Cup 2022, winning the first leg and second leg of the final 13-1 and 9-0 (22-1) against the Tibet women's football team.

Tournament records

VIVA Women's World Cup

Women's friendship cup

ConIFA Women's Football World Cup

Selected internationals

Head-to-head records against other countries

Best goal scorers

Managers

References

 
European N.F.-Board teams
Football in Finland
Football teams in Norway
Football in Sweden
Sámi
Sámi associations